Blue River Airport  is located adjacent to Blue River, British Columbia, Canada.

The Blue River Airport receives  precipitation per year.

References

External links
 Blue River Airport on COPA's Places to Fly airport directory

Registered aerodromes in British Columbia
Thompson-Nicola Regional District